Minuscule 878 (in the Gregory-Aland numbering), Θε200 (von Soden), is a 12th-century Greek minuscule manuscript of the New Testament on parchment. It has complex contents.

Formerly it was known as Codex Altemprianus.

Description 

The codex contains the text of the four Gospels on 248 parchment leaves (size ), with a commentary. The text is written in one column per page, 46 lines per page.

There is also a division according to the Ammonian Sections, with references to the Eusebian Canons.

It contains a commentary of Theophylact. According to Hermann von Soden it is an ornamented manuscript. It has not the Epistula ad Carpianum.

Text 
The Greek text of the codex Kurt Aland did not place it in any Category.
It was not examined by the Claremont Profile Method.

History 

According to F. H. A. Scrivener and C. R. Gregory it was written in the 12th century. Currently the manuscript is dated by the INTF to the 12th century.

The manuscript was added to the list of New Testament manuscripts by Scrivener (703e), Gregory (878e). Gregory saw it in 1886.

It was examined and described by Ernesto Feron and Fabiano Battaglini (like minuscule 386 and 880).

Currently the manuscript is housed at the Vatican Library (Ottob. gr. 37), in Rome.

See also 

 List of New Testament minuscules (1–1000)
 Biblical manuscript
 Textual criticism
 Minuscule 877

References

Further reading

External links 
 

Greek New Testament minuscules
12th-century biblical manuscripts
Manuscripts of the Vatican Library